Quincampoix-Fleuzy is a commune in the Oise department in northern France.

See also
 Communes of the Oise department

References

External links
 

Communes of Oise